N. Krishna Pillai (22 September 1916 – 10 July 1988) was an Indian dramatist, literary critic, translator and historian of Malayalam language. Known for his realism and dramatic portrayal of psycho-social tensions, Pillai's plays earned him the moniker, Kerala Ibsen. He was a recipient of the Sahitya Akademi Award, Kerala Sahitya Akademi Award for Drama, Odakkuzhal Award, Vayalar Award and Kerala Sangeetha Nataka Akademi Award, besides other honours. The Kerala Sahitya Akademi inducted him as a distinguished fellow in 1979.

Biography 
N. Krishna Pillai was born on September 22, 1916 at Muthana, a small village in Chirayinkeezhu taluk, Thiruvananthapuram district of the south Indian state of Kerala to Kakkattu Matom Kesavar Kesavan and Chekalavilakkathuveettil Parvathy Amma. After schooling at the local schools in Sivagiri and Attingal, he studies at Maharaja's College, Thiruvananthapuram, now known as University College Thiruvananthapuram from where he graduated with honours in Malayalam in 1938 and started his career as a teacher of Malayalam at Sivagiri Malayalam School. He quit the job in 1940 to pursue research at the University of Kerala and in 1943, he joined The Madurai Diraviyam Thayumanavar Hindu College as a lecturer but when he received a posting as a lecturer at the University College, the next year, he returned to Thiruvananthapuram to take up the post. Later, he worked in a number of other institutions such as Government Brennen College, Thalassery as a professor, Inermediate College, Thiruvananthapuram as the principal, and as the professor of Malayalam at the University College.

N. Krishna Pillai was married to Azhakattu Saraswathy Kunjamma, the marriage taking place in 1943, and the couple had four daughters, Sahiti, Kala, Madhuri and Nandini, and a son, Hari. Pillai died on July 10, 1988, at Sree Chitra Tirunal Institute for Medical Sciences and Technology, at the age of 71.

Legacy

Krishna Pillai's oeuvre consists of 14 plays of which three were written for radio, 13 one-act plays, 7 books of children's literature, literary criticisms, historical essays and research papers. He was credited with introducing social issues into Malayalam theatre at a time when mythological operas were the standard practice.

Pillai brought a new outlook to the Malayalam drama, by omitting the farcical humour and concentrating on detailed studies of the character and the society, portrayed in drama, which earned him the moniker, Kerala Ibsen. Bhagna-Bhavanam (Broken Home) published in 1942, Kanyaka (Spinster) (1944), Balabalam (Might against might) (1946), Anuranjanam (Compromise) (1954), Mutakkumutal (Investment) (1960) and Kutathile Vilakku (Lamp inside the pot) published in 1972 are some of his notable works. He also published 11 essay compilations, two books of memoirs and interviews and 9 books of children's literature. His book, Pratipathram Bhashanabhedham, is a detailed study of the novels of C. V. Raman Pillai and the book has won a number of awards.

Awards and honours 
When Kerala Sahitya Akademi introduced an annual award for drama in 1958, Krishna Pillai received the inaugural award, for the work, Azhimukhathekku. His essay compilation, Theranjedutha Prabhandangal was selected for the Odakkuzhal Award in 1972 and he received the Kerala Sangeetha Nataka Akademi Award in 1973. Kerala Sahitya Akademi inducted him as a distinguished fellow in 1979 and he received the Sahitya Akademi Award in 1987; he also received the Vayalar Award and C. V. Sahitya Puraskar, in 1987. He was also a recipient of the Father Abraham Vadakkel Award.

N. Krishna Pillai Foundation, an eponymous organization, organized a three-day arts festival in Thiruvananthapuram in memory of Krishna Pillai in 2018 on the occasion of the 75th anniversary of Kanyaka one of Pillai's works. N. Krishna Pillai Memorial Cultural Center, an institution in Pillai's honour, is situated at Palayam, Thiruvananthapuram, and houses a 250-seat mini theatre and N. Krishna Pillai Memorial library, a research centre with over 8000 titles. The Foundation also organizes an annual theatre festival in his honour.

Bibliography

Plays

Essays

Translations

Memoirs

References

Further reading

External links 
 
 

1916 births
1988 deaths
People from Varkala
Indian male dramatists and playwrights
Malayalam-language dramatists and playwrights
Indian literary critics
Indian literary historians
Recipients of the Sahitya Akademi Award in Malayalam
Recipients of the Kerala Sahitya Akademi Award
20th-century Indian dramatists and playwrights
20th-century Indian historians
Dramatists and playwrights from Kerala
20th-century Indian male writers
Recipients of the Sangeet Natak Akademi Award
Recipients of the Kerala Sangeetha Nataka Akademi Award